Charles-Victor Langlois (May 26, 1863, in Rouen – June 25, 1929, in Paris) was a French historian, archivist and paleographer, who specialized in the study of the Middle Ages and was a lecturer at the Sorbonne, where he taught paleography, bibliography, and the history of the Middle Ages.

Langlois attended the École Nationale des Chartes and earned a doctorate in history in 1887. He taught at the University of Douai before moving to the Sorbonne.  He was director of the National Archives of France from 1913 to 1929.  Langlois was a leader in use of the historical method, which taught a scientific form of studying history.  His "Manual of Historical Bibliography" was a fundamental manual on how bibliographic methods, which went along with his studies of the historical method.

His 1897 work Introduction aux études historiques, written with Charles Seignobos, is considered one of the first comprehensive manuals discussing the use of scientific techniques in historical research. The "Introduction to the Study of History" takes a very detailed view at finding a way to make history as accurate of a study as the sciences.  The basis of their method is the all history comes from facts retrieved from first hand documents.  These facts are then viewed by the historian from many different perspectives, allowing for an unbiased approach at history.  By using methods, such as external and internal criticism, the historian is able to see both the reader and authors perspective on a piece of history.  In order to get a completely accurate history, these facts must be sorted into categories into groups to allow for easy research.  To both of these men, the goal of history was to make it a learnable subject for anyone so that it may be passed down.

To emphasize the importance of primary sources, Seignobos and Langlois in their handbook coined the famous maxime "L'histoire se fait avec des documents".

His collaborator on "Introduction to the Study of History", Charles Seignobos was also a lecturer in Sorbonne in 1881.  Born in Lamastre, France, Seignobos came from a Protestant family and advocated systematic and methodical approach to the study of history.  His books are widely used in schools throughout France.  His work "The Evolution of the French People" was in an important work that traced the history of the French people, rather than its leaders.  Not an entire history of France, this book focused on the conditions of life and institutions that made up life in France.  It was also another example of his use of the historical method, as it attempts to explain certain conditions, rather than concentrating solely on individual characters.  His works include "History of ancient civilization, History of Mediaeval and of modern civilization to the end of the seventeenth century, A political history of contemporary Europe, since 1814, and The world of Babylon : Nineveh and Assyria.

Bibliography
Le Règne de Philippe III le Hardi (1887) Text freely available in gallica.bnf.fr
Les Archives de l’histoire de France, in collaboration with Henri Stein (1891)
Introduction aux études historiques, in collaboration with Charles Seignobos (1897) Text freely available in Les Classiques des sciences sociales
Manuel de bibliographie historique (1901, 1904) Text freely available in gallica.bnf.fr
La Connaissance de la nature et du monde au Moyen Âge (1911) Text freely available in gallica.bnf.fr
Saint-Louis, Philippe le Bel, les derniers Capétiens directs (1911) Text freely available in gallica.bnf.fr
La Vie en France au Moyen Âge : de la fin du XIIe au milieu du XIVe siècle (1927)

References

Further reading 
 Notice sur la vie et les travaux de Charles-Victor Langlois (1863-1929) par A. Merlin, CRAI, Institut de France, 1949, p. 1394-409.
 Profile at Virtual Museum of Protestantism
University of Quebec profile 
R. Fawtier, "Charles Victor Langlois", The English Historical Review, vol. 45, no. 177, Jan. 1930, pp. 85-91

External links
 
 
 
 

1863 births
1929 deaths
Members of the Académie des Inscriptions et Belles-Lettres
French archivists
19th-century French historians
French medievalists
École Nationale des Chartes alumni
University of Paris alumni
Academic staff of the University of Paris
Academic staff of the University of Douai
French male non-fiction writers
20th-century French historians